The Commission on Audit (COA) is an independent constitutional commission established by the Constitution of the Philippines. It has the primary function to examine, audit and settle all accounts and expenditures of the funds and properties of the Philippine government.

The Commission on Audit is a creation of the 1987 constitution. It was preceded by the Office of the Auditor in 1899, renamed as the Bureau of the Insular Auditor in 1900, then to the Bureau of Audits in 1905. The 1935 constitution created the General Auditing Office (GAO), and was led by the Auditor General. The 1973 constitution renamed the GAO to the Commission on Audit, a collegial body led by a chairman, with two commissioners. That setup was retained by the 1987 constitution.

The other two Constitutional Commissions are the Commission on Elections and Civil Service Commission.

Members

Description
The Commission on Audit is composed of a Chairperson and two Commissioners. They must be natural-born citizens of at least thirty-five years of age, and must be either a Certified Public Accountant or a lawyer. The members of the commission are appointed by the President of the Philippines, with the consent of the Commission of Appointments, for a term of seven years without reappointment.

In Funa v. Villar, the Supreme Court ruled that a Commissioner can only be appointed as Chairman if the unexpired term for the office of chairman and the term that the Commissioner had already served does not exceed seven years. In such case, the Commissioner promoted as Chairman would serve the unexpired term of the chairman, forfeiting the duration of his original term as Commissioner. This was based on a case where Reynaldo A. Villar, who was appointed commissioner in 2004, was then appointed as chairman in 2008, making him serve out eleven years in total. Villar resigned before he served out the full seven-year term as chairman, but prior to the resolution of the case.

The 1987 Constitution staggered the terms of the members of the Constitutional Commissions. Of the first appointees, the Chairman would serve seven years (1st line), a Commissioner would serve five years (2nd line), and another Commissioner would serve three years (3rd line). Each seven-year term is denoted by alternating black and gray bars in the table below. 

The members of the commission can only be removed from office via death, resignation or impeachment.

Current composition

Former auditor generals

Former members of the Commission on Audit

See also 
 Supreme audit institution, similar offices in other countries

References

External links 
 The Official Website of the Commission on Audit

Audir
Philippines
Supreme audit institutions